Di komunistishe velt ('The Communist World') was a Yiddish language journal published biweekly from Moscow 1919–1920. It was an organ of the Jewish Commissariat. The journal was published  The first issue of Di komunistishe velt was published on May 1, 1919, by  - a former anarchist from the United States having joined the Bolsheviks.

As publication of Der Emes was interrupted in the midst of the Russian Civil War, Di komunistishe velt came to function as the central party organ in Yiddish. The Jewish Commissariat recruited a non-Bolshevik, Daniel Charney, for the position as editor-in-chief of Di komunistishe velt.

Debates on Yiddish language reform played out in the issues of Di komunistishe velt.

References

Jews and Judaism in Moscow
Secular Jewish culture in Europe
Socialism in Russia
Yiddish communist newspapers
Yiddish-language mass media in Russia